Molham "Mo" Babouli (born January 2, 1993) is a professional footballer who plays for York United of the Canadian Premier League. Born in the United Arab Emirates, he represented Canada at youth level and currently represents the Syria national team.

Club career

Toronto FC
Babouli spent time at Sheridan College before joining the TFC Academy in 2014. He played with the senior academy side in the inaugural season of League1 Ontario, where he led the league in scoring with 27 goals in all competitions. TFC Academy would go on to win the regular season title and the Inter-Provincial Cup championship against CS Longueuil, the champions of the Première ligue de soccer du Québec. He won the Golden Boot and League MVP honours for the 2014 season.

On March 12, 2015, Babouli signed his first professional contract with Toronto FC II ahead of their inaugural season in the USL. He made his professional debut against the Charleston Battery on March 21, and scored his first goal for the club in the same match. His performance in the match was rewarded with a USL team of the week appearance on March 24.

On March 5, 2016, Babouli signed with Toronto FC. He made his MLS debut against Sporting Kansas City on March 20, as a substitute for Tsubasa Endoh. He returned to Toronto FC II on loan ahead of the 2016 USL season. On April 21, 2017, the club announced that Babouli had been placed on waivers.

Sigma FC
Babouli signed with Sigma following his release from TFC. He scored a goal in his debut against Aurora on July 8, 2017.

Al-Ittihad
In September 2017, Babouli joined Syrian club Al-Ittihad of the Syrian Premier League.  They finished in second place in the 2017–18 season, after losing a tie-breaker to Al-Jaish with whom they were level on points.

Mississauga MetroStars
Babouli signed for MASL club Mississauga MetroStars ahead of their inaugural season on November 2, 2018. In his debut season in the MASL he was named the Newcomer of the Year. Babouli was announced as the MetroStars' new team captain ahead of the 2019–20 MASL season.

FC Ukraine United 
Babouli played in the Canadian Soccer League for the 2019 season with FC Ukraine United. In his debut match on September 8, 2019 he recorded four goals against Brantford Galaxy. He recorded his second hat-trick on October 1, 2019 against SC Real Mississauga. As a result finished as the club's top goalscorer with nine goals and the league's fourth leading goalscorer, despite only playing four games – Mykola Temniuk led the league with 18 goals in 17 games.

In the opening match of the postseason Babouli scored against Hamilton City SC, and advanced to the next round after a penalty shootout. In the semifinal he contributed another goal in a 5–3 victory against SC Waterloo Region, and advanced to the CSL Championship. He featured in the finals against Scarborough SC, but in a losing effort. In early 2020, he trailed with Canadian Premier League club York United FC.

Forge FC
On August 4, 2020, Canadian Premier League club Forge FC announced the signing of Babouli to a contract. He made his debut for the  club as a substitute on August 13 in the 2020 season opener against Cavalry FC. On September 19, Forge defeated HFX Wanderers FC in the 2020 CPL Final to win the league title. Babouli assisted on the game's winning goal and was named Man of the match. Babouli re-signed with Forge for the 2021 Canadian Premier League season. By winning the 2020 season, Forge qualified for the 2021 CONCACAF League. In the preliminary round, Forge faced C.D. FAS, and Babouli scored the winning goal in the first leg that Forge would win 3–1. A 2–2 draw in the second leg meant Forge would advance. In the next round, Forge faced Panamanian club Independiente. After a scoreless first leg, Babouli would again send Forge through to the next round by opening the scoring in a 2–0 victory. In the quarter-finals against Costa Rican club Santos de Guápiles, Forge lost the first leg away 3–1, but Babouli played the hero in the second leg, first assisting Omar Browne's goal, and then scoring himself to give Forge the lead on away goals, though Joshua Navarro would later seal the game for Forge by making it 3–0. This victory sent Forge into the semi-finals and also qualified them for the 2022 CONCACAF Champions League, becoming the first ever Canadian Premier league club to do so. Babouli scored 3 goals and contributed 2 assists in the tournament and was honoured in the Team of the Tournament.

Muaither SC
In 2022, Babouli joined Muaither SC in the Qatari Second Division.

York United
In August 2022, Babouli joined York United FC on a contract through the 2024 season. He made his debut for his new club on August 14, entering in as a substitute against FC Edmonton. In York's next game on August 20, Babouli scored his first goal against his former club Forge FC in an eventual 3-1 victory.

International career 
Babouli was eligible to represent the United Arab Emirates (through birth), Syria (through descent), and Canada (through residency). Babouli made his debut for the Canadian program with the U23 side at the 2015 Pan American Games. He played his first match against Brazil U23 and scored a goal in a 4–1 defeat. Babouli was named to the 2015 CONCACAF Men's Olympic Qualifying Championship team on September 18, 2015.

In November 2021, he was named to Syria's preliminary squad for the 2021 FIFA Arab Cup. He made his debut for the team against the country of his birth, United Arab Emirates, in a 2022 FIFA World Cup qualifier on January 27, 2022.

Personal life
In April 2018, Babouli was detained by the Syrian Military Police upon obtaining the Syrian Identity Card, due to the fact that each Syrian male has to do the mandatory military service. He was released days later after paying the fee required for the exemption of the military duties.

Career statistics

Club

Honours

Club
Sheridan College
CCAA National Championship: 2014

Toronto FC III
League1 Ontario League Champions: 2014
L1O/PLSQ Inter-Provincial Cup Champions: 2014

Toronto FC
Canadian Championship: 2016
Trillium Cup: 2016

Forge FC
Canadian Premier League: 2020

Individual
League1 Ontario Golden Boot: 2014
League1 Ontario MVP: 2014
Major Arena Soccer League Newcomer of the Year: 2018–19
CONCACAF League Team Of The Tournament: 2021

References

External links
 
 

1993 births
Living people
Association football forwards
Canadian soccer players
Syrian footballers
People from Al Ain
Soccer players from Mississauga
Canadian people of Syrian descent
Canadian expatriate soccer players
Expatriate soccer players in the United States
Canadian expatriate sportspeople in the United States
Toronto FC II players
Toronto FC players
Mississauga MetroStars players
FC Ukraine United players
Forge FC players
Muaither SC players
League1 Ontario players
USL Championship players
Major League Soccer players
Syrian Premier League players
Major Arena Soccer League players
Qatari Second Division players
Canadian Soccer League (1998–present) players
Canadian Premier League players
Canada men's under-23 international soccer players
Footballers at the 2015 Pan American Games
Homegrown Players (MLS)
Pan American Games competitors for Canada
Sigma FC players
Expatriate footballers in Qatar
York United FC players